FC Colombier are a football team from Colombier, Switzerland who are currently playing in the 2L Inter Group 1 2009–10.

FC Colombier's traditional kit colours are red-and-white shirts, with shorts and white socks.

Current squad

References

External links
 Official website

Association football clubs established in 1923
Colombier
1923 establishments in Switzerland